Numan Okumuş (born 2 November 1939) is a Turkish footballer. He played in two matches for the Turkey national football team in 1965.

References

1939 births
Living people
Turkish footballers
Turkey international footballers
Place of birth missing (living people)
Association footballers not categorized by position